Scuffletown is an unincorporated community located in Bullitt County, Kentucky, United States.

References

Unincorporated communities in Bullitt County, Kentucky
Unincorporated communities in Kentucky